Gaspare Guercio (1611 - 1670/1679) was an Italian artist, nicknamed 'Guercio' and a major proponent of the Sicilian Baroque. He was principally a sculptor but also a designer of decorative schemes for architectural projects. He collaborated with his pupil Gaspare Serpotta, father of the more famous Giacomo Serpotta.

Life 
Born in Palermo, he was trained in sculpture by his father, a reputed 'marmoraio' and sculptor in his own right.

Works

Palermo

Other 

 St George Saving a Maiden, marble medallion, 1660, facade of Caccamo Cathedral.
 Altarpiece, marble, Santa Maria Assunta Basilica, Randazzo
 Saint Anne and the Virgin Mary as a Child, marble sculptural group, attributed, Monastery of Santa Maria delle Grazie, Burgio.

References

Bibliography 
  Gaspare Palermo,  "Guida istruttiva per potersi conoscere ... tutte le magnificenze ... della Città di Palermo", Volume IV, Palermo, Reale Stamperia, 1816.

External links 
 Biographical archive, comune di Palermo 

Italian male sculptors
17th-century Italian architects
17th-century Italian sculptors
Italian Baroque architects
Italian Baroque sculptors
1611 births
1670s deaths
Year of death uncertain
People from Palermo